Linley Point is a small peninsular suburb located on the Lower North Shore of Sydney , in the local government area of the Municipality of Lane Cove, in the state of New South Wales, Australia. It is approximately 10 kilometres north-west of the Sydney central business district by car.

Location
Linley Point is situated between the peninsula of Hunters Hill and Woolwich to the south, and Lane Cove to the north. It is less than 10 km to the Sydney CBD by car. Much of Linley Point is surrounded by the Lane Cove River, and is accessed from the south over Figtree Bridge, and from the north via Burns Bay Road. Due to its elevation many houses have views of the river and Sydney city, with some houses also having views of the Sydney Harbour Bridge.

Houses 
Linley Point is one of the smallest suburbs in Sydney, with 131 dwellings. It has undergone some redevelopment, particularly of older homes. Linley Point is also home to several historic houses, including the NSW heritage listed "Linley House" on View Street, and "Rockcliffe" on Lower Brooks Street.

Heritage listings 
Linley Point has a number of heritage-listed sites, including:
 360 Burns Bay Road: Linley House

Parks 
Linley Point has a relatively large park situated on The Crescent. It is sometimes used for annual get-together events by Linley Point residents. New playground equipment and landscaping were added to the park in 2012. The changing demographics of the suburb has seen the park regularly used by local children.

Transport 
There is only one access road in and out of Linley Point, being View St. There is a bus stop on Burns Bay Road near View St, which has Busways and Transit Systems buses going to Chatswood and Gladesville, as well as school bus services. The closest Sydney Ferries wharf is either Woolwich or Huntleys Point.

References

External links
 

Suburbs of Sydney
Lane Cove Council
Lane Cove River